Paul Heusser Hoernemann (May 18, 1916 – February 28, 1965) was an American football and basketball coach. He served as head football coach at Heidelberg College—now known as Heidelberg University— in Tiffin, Ohio from 1946 to 1959, compiling a record of 102–18–4 and winning five Ohio Athletic Conference (OAC) titles. Hoernemann was also the head basketball coach at Heidelberg from 1946 to 1955, tallying a mark of 90–77.

Hoernemann arrived at Heidelberg from New Philadelphia High School, where he had a 24–3 record. After the 1959 season, Hoernemann became a vice president at Heidelberg. He held this position until his death in 1965. In 1966, the new dining hall at Heidelberg was named the Hoernemann Refectory. He was inducted into the Ohio High School Coaches Association Hall of Fame in 1994 and the College Football Hall of Fame in 1997.

Head coaching record

College football

References

External links
 

1916 births
1965 deaths
Heidelberg Student Princes football coaches
Heidelberg Student Princes men's basketball coaches
High school basketball coaches in Ohio
High school football coaches in Ohio
College Football Hall of Fame inductees
Sportspeople from Lima, Ohio
Coaches of American football from Ohio
Basketball coaches from Ohio